Bandes d'ordonnance (French) or Benden van ordonnantie (Dutch) were elite heavy cavalry formations recruited from the aristocracy in the early-modern Low Countries. They were originally formed by Charles the Bold, Duke of Burgundy, and became an integral part of the military organization of the Low Countries from the mid-fifteenth to late-sixteenth centuries, up to the first years of the Eighty Years' War. They continued to exist into the seventeenth century with far less military importance, although a command in a Bande d'ordonnance was still a considerable social distinction.

References
Baron Guillaume, Histoire des Bandes d'Ordonnance des Pays-Bas (Brussels, Académie royale de Belgique, 1873)
D. J. B. Trim, "Army, Society and Military Professionalism in the Netherlands", in The Chivalric Ethos and the Development of Military Professionalism, 2003, pp. 279-280.
H.F.K. van Nierop, The Nobility of Holland, 1993, p. 160.
Fernando González de León, The Road to Rocroi, 2009, pp. 23-24.

External links
The New York Public Library Vinkhuijzen Collection of Military Costume Illustration contains the following images:
Bande d'ordonnance of Charles the Bold, 1473.
Bande d'ordonnance of Charles V, 1543.
Lancers of the bandes d'ordonnance, 1572
Man at arms of the bandes d'ordonnance, 1608.

Military units and formations of the Early Modern period
Cavalry units and formations
Eighty Years' War